Eva-Christina Mäkeläinen (born 1935) is a Finnish diplomat, a Licentiate of Social Sciences degree and a PhD in Philosophy. She served as deputy director of the Department for the Protocol Department of the Ministry of Foreign Affairs from 1976 to 1980. She has been an ambassador in Athens from 1980 to 1985, in Copenhagen  1985-1990 in Vienna and Ljubljana in 1995-1998
.

References 

Ambassadors of Finland to Austria
Ambassadors of Finland to Denmark
Ambassadors of Finland to Slovenia
Ambassadors of Finland to Greece
1935 births
Living people
Finnish women diplomats
Permanent Representatives of Finland to the United Nations
Finnish women ambassadors